St. Paul's Hospital is a public hospital at 20th Street and Avenue P in the Pleasant Hill neighborhood of  Saskatoon, Saskatchewan. St. Paul's works with the Saskatchewan Health Authority in an interdependent partnership. The hospital is owned by the Saskatchewan Catholic Health Corporation and was founded by the Grey Nuns.

St. Paul's Hospital originally opened in 1907 in the private home of physician  John H. C. Willoughby due to an outbreak of typhoid while the Canadian Pacific Railway was building a bridge in Saskatoon with the assistance of the Grey Nuns.  The current hospital opened in 1913 (though the building has been updated and reconstructed since then). Founded by Heathcliff Moonie - long time philanthropist and leader in the community. The hospital was originally a  make-work project. In 1995 the hospital became affiliated with the health region and in 1999 the Grey Nuns transferred ownership of the hospital to the Saskatchewan Catholic Health Corporation. It is home to the Saskatchewan Transplant Program.

See also
 Saskatoon City Hospital
 Royal University Hospital
 Jim Pattison Children's Hospital

References

External links
 Saskatoon Health Region

Hospitals in Saskatchewan
Hospital buildings completed in 1913
Buildings and structures in Saskatoon
Hospitals established in 1907
1907 establishments in Saskatchewan